George Hamilton-Browne (22 December 1844 – 21 January 1916) was a British irregular soldier, adventurer, writer and impostor. He was born into a military family of Irish descent in Cheltenham, Gloucestershire on 22 December 1844. He was the son of George Browne (Capt 44th Regiment) and Susanna Mary Hilton, who were married in Manchester 7 March 1844. He was twice married and died in Jamaica in January 1916.

He was present at the Battle of Isandlwana in the Zulu War of 1879. He wrote three books about his experiences, some details of which have been claimed to be of dubious authenticity.

References

External links
 
 

1844 births
1916 deaths
New Zealand writers
Impostors
New Zealand military personnel
New Zealand criminals
Irish emigrants to New Zealand (before 1923)
British military personnel of the Anglo-Zulu War
British colonial army officers